Floyd Westerman, also known as Kanghi Duta ("Red Crow" in Dakota) (August 17, 1936 – December 13, 2007), was a Dakota Sioux musician, political activist, and actor. After establishing a career as a country music singer, later in his life he became an actor, usually depicting Native American elders in American films and television. He is also credited as Floyd Red Crow Westerman. As a political activist, he spoke and marched for Native American causes.

Early life
He was born Floyd Westerman on the Lake Traverse Indian Reservation, home of the Sisseton Wahpeton Oyate, a federally recognized tribe that is one of the sub-tribes of the Eastern Dakota section of the Great Sioux Nation, located in the U.S. state of South Dakota. His Indigenous name Kanghi Duta means "Red Crow" in the Dakota language (which is one of the three related Siouan languages of the Great Plains).

At the age of 10, Westerman was sent to the Wahpeton Boarding School, where he first met Dennis Banks (who as an adult became a leader of the American Indian Movement).  There Westerman and the other children were forced to cut their traditionally long hair and forbidden to speak their native languages.  This experience would profoundly impact Westerman's development and entire life. As an adult, he reclaimed his heritage and became an outspoken advocate for Indigenous cultural preservation.

Westerman graduated from Northern State University with a B.A. degree in secondary education. He served two years in the US Marines, before beginning his career as a country singer.

Career
Before entering films and television, Westerman had established a solid reputation as a country-western music singer. In his songwriting he explored and critiqued the European influences on Native American communities. In addition to several solo recordings, Westerman collaborated with Jackson Browne, Willie Nelson, Bonnie Raitt, Harry Belafonte, Joni Mitchell, Kris Kristofferson, and Buffy Sainte-Marie.  In the 1990s, he toured with Sting to raise funds to preserve the endangered rain forests.

After years performing as a singer, Westerman became interested in acting.  His film debut was in Renegades (1989), in which he played "Red Crow", the Lakota Sioux father of Hank Storm, played by Lou Diamond Phillips.  Additional film roles include "Chief Ten Bears" in Dances with Wolves (1990), and the "shaman" for the singer Jim Morrison in Oliver Stone's The Doors (1991). Westerman appeared as Standing Elk, alongside his long-time friend Max Gail, in the family film, Tillamook Treasure (2006). He appeared in Hidalgo (2004), as Chief Eagle Horn in Buffalo Bill's circus. In September 2007, Westerman finished work for the film Swing Vote (2008).

Television roles included playing "George" on Dharma & Greg, "Uncle Ray" on Walker, Texas Ranger (in the pilot and first regular seasons), "One Who Waits" on Northern Exposure, and multiple appearances as "Albert Hosteen" on The X-Files.  Westerman also did numerous Public Service Announcements for television including for the United Nations Earth Summit in Rio in 1992.

Death
Westerman died from complications of leukemia at Cedars-Sinai Medical Center in Los Angeles on December 13, 2007. He was survived by his wife Rosie, four daughters, and a son.

Selected filmography
Powwow Highway (1989) - CB Radio Voice (voice)
Renegades (1989) - Red Crow
Dances with Wolves (1990) - Ten Bears
The Making of 'Dances with Wolves (1990) - TV Short documentary - Himself
Son of the Morning Star (1991, TV Mini-Series) - Sitting Bull
The Doors (1991) - Shaman
Clearcut (1991) - Wilf
The Broken Chain (1993, TV Movie) - Tribe Elder
Jonathan of the Bears (1994) - Chief Tawanka
Lakota Woman: Siege at Wounded Knee (1994, TV Movie) - Mary's grandfather
500 Nations (1995, TV Mini-Series) - (voice)
Buffalo Girls (1995, TV Mini-Series) - No Ears
Dusting Cliff 7 (1997) - Indian Bob
The Brave (1997) - Papa
Naturally Native (1998) - Chairman Pico
Grey Owl (1999) - Pow Wow Chief 
Graduation Night (2003) - Old Man
Atlantis: Milo's Return (2003) - Chakashi (voice)
Dreamkeeper (2003, TV Movie) - Iron Spoon
Hidalgo (2004) - Chief Eagle Horn
Tillamook Treasure (2006) - Standing Elk
Comanche Moon (2008, TV Mini-Series) - First Old Comanche
Swing Vote (2008) - Chief Running Bear (final film role)

Selected television appearances
MacGyver (1988, TV series) - Two Eagles
Captain Planet and the Planeteers (1990, TV series) - Indian Chief (voice)
L.A. Law (1991, TV series) - Judge William Gainser
Northern Exposure (1991-1993, TV series) - One-Who-Waits
Murder, She Wrote (1992, TV series) - Uncle Ashie Nakai
Walker, Texas Ranger (1993-1994, TV series) - Uncle Ray Firewalker; 26 episodes
500 Nations (1995, TV Mini-Series) (voice)
Roseanne (1995, TV series) - Floyd
The X-Files (1995-1999, TV series) - Albert Hosteen
The Pretender (1997, TV series) - Ernie Two Feathers
Baywatch Nights (1997, TV series) - Indian Guide Wahote
Poltergeist: The Legacy (1997, TV series) - Ezekial
Millennium (1997, TV series) - Old Indian
Dharma & Greg (1997-2001, TV series) - George Littlefox
Judging Amy (2001, TV series) - Mr. Wheeler

Discography
 Custer Died for Your Sins (1969)
 Indian Country (1970)
 Custer Died for Your Sins (re-recording; 1982)
 The Land is Your Mother (1982)
 A Tribute to Johnny Cash (2006)

See also

References

Further reading

External links
 

 In Memoriam: Floyd Red Crow Westerman at TillamookTreasure.com
 Audio profile  at Tjwestern.com

20th-century Native Americans
Native American male actors
Native American musicians
Native American activists
Members of the American Indian Movement
Activists from South Dakota
American country singer-songwriters
American male singer-songwriters
American male film actors
American male television actors
20th-century American male actors
20th-century American male singers
20th-century American singers
Male actors from South Dakota
Singers from South Dakota
Northern State University alumni
People from Sisseton, South Dakota
South Dakota Independents
Sisseton Wahpeton Oyate people
Native American United States military personnel
United States Marines
Deaths from cancer in California
Deaths from leukemia
1936 births
2007 deaths